The George Cross (GC) is the highest civil decoration for heroism in the United Kingdom, a status it also holds, or has held, in several countries comprising the Commonwealth of Nations. The George Cross (Post-nominal letters "GC") is regarded as the civilian counterpart of the Victoria Cross, and is awarded to civilians for "acts of the greatest heroism" or to military personnel for actions that are not "in the face of the enemy" or for which purely military honours would not normally be granted. In an official radio broadcast on 23 September 1940, King George VI announced his decision to establish the awards of the GC and George Medal to recognise individual acts of bravery by the civilian population. The Royal Warrant that established the awards was published in The London Gazette on 31 January 1941. Australians received the GC under the Imperial honours system until 5 October 1992 when after more than two years of negotiations with Australian State governments, the Australian prime minister, Paul Keating, announced that Australia would make no further recommendations for British honours. Australians are today eligible for the Cross of Valour instituted by letters patent within the Commonwealth of Australia and its Territories on 14 February 1975 under the Australian honours system.

Between the first award of the GC to an Australian in 1942 and the final bestowal to Constable Michael Kenneth Pratt in 1978, 14 Australians were directly decorated with the medal. Of these, nine were awarded to military personnel and five to civilians. Eight of the medals were awarded posthumously. At the time of the institution of the GC, living recipients of the Empire Gallantry Medal automatically became recipients of the new award, and were required to return their previous medal; two Australians became GC holders through this method.

Exchange recipients 
In 1971, the British Government announced that living recipients of the Albert Medal and Edward Medal would henceforth be recipients of the GC with the option of exchanging their insignia for that of the GC. The decision for such an action was the result of the decline in the status and significance of the two awards, leading recipients to feel they were not receiving the recognition they were due. Of the 27 Australian holders of the Albert Medal, six were living at the time and all opted to exchange their insignia for the GC. None of the eight Australians awarded the Edward Medal were alive in 1971, and thus no Australian became a recipient of the GC through this exchange. Including exchange awards, a total of 22 Australians were decorated with the GC.

Recipients

Direct awards of the George Cross

Empire Gallantry Medal and Albert Medal exchanges
EGM = This indicates a recipient of the Empire Gallantry Medal who exchanged the award for the George Cross.
AM = This indicates a recipient of the Albert Medal who exchanged the award for the George Cross.

Notes

References 
 
 

 
George Cross recipients